Umuofa is a village in Imo State, southeastern Nigeria. It is located near the city of Owerri.

Towns in Imo State
Villages in Igboland